French peanut is a common name for several plants and may refer to:

Pachira aquatica, also called Malabar chestnut
Pachira glabra, also called Guinea peanut